Aprasia rostrata, also known as the Hermite Island worm-lizard or Exmouth worm-lizard, is a species of lizard in the Pygopodidae family endemic to Australia.

References

Pygopodids of Australia
Aprasia
Reptiles described in 1956
Endemic fauna of Australia